Trousil is a Czech surname. Notable people with the surname include:

 Jan Trousil (born 1976), Czech footballer
 Josef Trousil (born 1935), Czech athlete

Czech-language surnames